"Couch Potato" is a parody song by American satirist "Weird Al" Yankovic.  It is a parody of the Academy Award winning song "Lose Yourself" by Eminem. In it, the narrator details his obsession with watching television and the television shows he watches.

Release
"Couch Potato" was originally going to be the lead single of Poodle Hat, but due to Eminem's concern that it might hurt his career, its commercial release was cancelled. "Couch Potato" has never been released as a promo, nor a commercial single. It is only available on the Poodle Hat CD, or as a digital download on the internet.

Cancelled music video
Yankovic intended to make a music video for the song, but the plan was scrapped at the last minute when Eminem denied him permission to make a video, expressing concerns that it might disparage his image. According to Yankovic, the video would have included a "patchwork quilt" pastiche of scenes from other Eminem videos.

Yankovic told the Chicago Sun-Times in 2004, "Last year, Eminem forced me to halt production on the video for my 'Lose Yourself' parody because he somehow thought that it would be harmful to his image or career."

Yankovic mocked the situation on his Al TV special where he staged a mock interview with the rapper using footage from a real Eminem interview on MTV News. Eminem said "I believe in...artistic expression."  Al countered with "So you think, for example if somebody wanted to do, oh, I don't know, a parody of somebody else's video, they should be able to...artistically express themselves and just do it?" Eminem was shown at a loss for words.

Also in the mock interview, Al simply played the first verse on a boombox while sitting in a chair, reading a newspaper until Eminem eventually turned it off.

Eminem references the interview in his book The Way I Am, saying that "Weird Al" took some jabs at him. He said he thinks Yankovic is funny, and thought the "interview" was funny.

References in the song

Television shows and movies
8 Simple Rules for Dating My Teenage Daughter
24
60 Minutes
Da Ali G Show
The Amazing Race
American Idol
The Anna Nicole Show
Are You Hot?
The Bachelorette
Celebrity Mole
CSI: Boise (referring to CSI and its many spinoffs, such as CSI: Miami)
The Drew Carey Show
E! True Hollywood Story
Entertainment Tonight
Everybody Tolerates Raymond (referring to Everybody Loves Raymond)
Fear Factor
The Flintstones
Gilligan's Island
Inside the Actors Studio
King of Queens
Larry King Live
Law & Order
Lost in Space
MacGyver
Melrose Place
The Muppet Show
NASCAR
The Oprah Winfrey Show
The Osbournes (referred to as Ozzy's family's show)
Scanners
Six Feet Under (referred to as "that show about undertaking")
The Sopranos
SpongeBob SquarePants
Survivor
The Tonight Show with Jay Leno
Touched by an Uncle (referring to Touched by an Angel)
Welcome Back, Kotter
Will & Grace
Without a Trace

Television networks
A&E
AMC
Court TV
C-SPAN
Discovery Channel
Disney Channel
Fox
HBO
History Channel
Learning Channel
Lifetime Television
MTV
Playboy Channel
QVC
Sci-Fi Channel
Travel Channel
TV Land
Weather Channel

Celebrities
Drew Carey
Simon Cowell
Larry King
Lisa Kudrow
Jay Leno
James Lipton
Jennifer Lopez
Madonna
Ozzy Osbourne
Luke Perry
Rob Schneider
Richard Simmons
Anna Nicole Smith
Oprah Winfrey

See also
List of singles by "Weird Al" Yankovic
List of songs by "Weird Al" Yankovic

External links 

 Couch Potato on YouTube

Notes
Yankovic performed the song live on The Late Late Show with Craig Kilborn on May 21, 2003, the day after the release of Poodle Hat.
Yankovic also performed a modified version on Nickelodeon Magazines 10th Anniversary special. He had to edit the song, however. The second verse as well as the second chorus were cut and instead of saying "gay", he and his band said "hey", and the reference to the Playboy Channel was also cut from the song.
A reference to this song is made in the comic Vicious Whisper, released by Aaron Alexovich alongside the comic Serenity Rose both of which are published by Slave Labor Graphics. In the comic, an actual fan of the series poses the question "look... if you had... one shot... to sit on your lazy butt and watch all the TV you wanted, would you take it? Or just let it slide?" Presumably, because Aaron A. did not notice the reference to the song, Vicious Whisper answers this question honestly in an in-depth speech.

References

2003 singles
Eminem
Songs with lyrics by "Weird Al" Yankovic
"Weird Al" Yankovic songs
Songs about television
Songs written by Luis Resto (musician)
Songs written by Eminem
Comedy rap songs
2003 songs
American hip hop songs
Songs written by Jeff Bass